The 1987 Tour de France was the 74th edition of Tour de France, one of cycling's Grand Tours. The Tour began in West Berlin with a prologue individual time trial on 1 July and Stage 12 occurred on 12 July with a flat stage to Bordeaux. The race finished on the Champs-Élysées in Paris on 26 July.

Prologue
1 July 1987 — West Berlin,  (individual time trial)

Stage 1
2 July 1987 — West Berlin to West Berlin,

Stage 2
2 July 1987 — West Berlin to West Berlin,  (team time trial)

Stage 3
4 July 1987 — Karlsruhe to Stuttgart,

Stage 4
5 July 1987 — Stuttgart to Pforzheim,

Stage 5
5 July 1987 — Pforzheim to Strasbourg,

Stage 6
6 July 1987 — Strasbourg to Épinal,

Stage 7
7 July 1987 — Épinal to Troyes,

Stage 8
8 July 1987 — Troyes to Épinay-sous-Sénart,

Stage 9
9 July 1987 — Orléans to Renazé,

Stage 10
10 July 1987 — Saumur to Futuroscope,  (individual time trial)

Stage 11
11 July 1987 — Poitiers to Chaumeil,

Stage 12
12 July 1987 — Brive to Bordeaux,

References

1987 Tour de France
Tour de France stages